The women's high jump event  at the 1976 European Athletics Indoor Championships was held on 21 February in Munich.

Results

References

High jump at the European Athletics Indoor Championships
High
Euro